Çakıbağ  (former Dilbeyan) is a belde (town) in the central district (Karaman) of Karaman Province, Turkey. The population of Çakırbağ is 1451  as of 2010. Çakırbağ is a Tatar town founded during Ottoman Empire era.

References

Populated places in Karaman Province
Towns in Turkey
Karaman Central District